Segantini is a surname. Notable people with the surname include:

Giovanni Segantini (1858–1899), Italian painter
Luca Segantini, executive director of the International Society of Nephrology (2009–2018)

Italian-language surnames